Beyond the Mist is guitarist and songwriter Robin Trower's eleventh solo album and his first after leaving Chrysalis Records. It was released in 1985 and contains two studio tracks and five live recordings. Cover painting is by Tony Roberts. The album was re-released on CD by Jem and re-issued on CD by Black Cross in 2007.

Track listing
All songs written by Robin Trower, except where noted.

Side one
"The Last Time" (Kevin Williams, Robin Trower) – 5:56
"Keeping a Secret" (Reg Webb, Trower) – 4:16
"The Voice" – 4:17
"Beyond the Mist" – 5:30

Side two
"Time Is Short"  – 4:35
"Back It Up" (Webb, Trower) – 5:00
"Bridge of Sighs" – 10:29

Personnel
 Robin Trower – guitar
 Dave Bronze – bass, vocals
 Martin Clapson – drums
Technical
Recorded and mixed by Steve Forward

Tracks 3 to 7 recorded live in April 1985 at The Marquee Club, London, England.

References

External links 
 Robin Trower - Beyond the Mist (1985) album releases & credits at Discogs
 Robin Trower - Beyond the Mist (1985) album to be listened on YouTube

1985 live albums
Robin Trower albums
Roadrunner Records live albums